The Robert Morris Colonials women represented Robert Morris University in CHA women's ice hockey during the 2015–16 NCAA Division I women's ice hockey season. The Colonials finished conference play in fourth place, and were eliminated in the semifinal of the CHA Tournament by Mercyhurst.

Offseason
July 1: 2011 Graduate Brianne McLaughlin signs as goaltender for Buffalo Beauts of the NWHL.

Recruiting

Standings

Roster

2015–16 Colonials

Schedule

|-
!colspan=12 style=" "| Regular Season

|-
!colspan=12 style=" "|CHA Tournament

Awards and honors

Brittany Howard F, 2015–16 All-CHA First Team 
Mikaela Lowater D, 2015–16 All-CHA First Team
Maggie LaGue D, 2015–16 All-CHA Rookie Team
Sarah Quaranta F, 2015–16 All-CHA Rookie Team

References

Robert Morris
Robert Morris Lady Colonials ice hockey seasons
Robert
Robert